The Pishdadian dynasty is a mythical line of primordial kings featured in Zoroastrian belief and Persian mythology, who are presented in legend as originally rulers of the world but whose realm was eventually limited to Ērānshahr or Greater Iran. Although there are scattered references to them in the Zoroastrian scriptures  the Avesta  and later Pahlavi literature, it is through the 11th century Iranian national epic, the Shahnameh, that the canonical form of their legends is known. From the 9th century, Muslim writers, notably Tabari, re-told many of the Pishdadian legends in prose histories and other works. The Pishdadian kings and the stories relating to them have no basis in historical fact, however.

According to the Shahnameh, the Pishdadians were the first Iranian dynasty, pre-dating the historical Achaemenids, and ruling for a period of over two thousand years. Their progenitor was Keyumars, the first human and the “Zoroastrian Adam”. He was followed by his descendants who, as kings of the world, fought demons and improved the lives of humankind by introducing them to new knowledge and skills. His most renowned successor, Jamshid, established the main elements of civilization, but, as a result of his pride and hubris, was overthrown by the evil tyrant Zahhak. Following a popular insurrection against Zahhak, the throne was eventually restored to the Pishdadians. However, the next king, Fereydun, divided the world between his three sons with his youngest, Iraj, receiving Iran, the choicest portion, after whom it is named. Iraj and his successors aroused the envy of the other descendants of Fereydun leading to a lengthy feud and series of wars which eventually caused the downfall of the dynasty. The Shahnameh tells how the Iranians, having no confidence in the last of the Pishdadians, replaced them with another mythical dynasty, the Kayanians.

Tabari repeated many of the same stories in his History, with some variations. As with many of the medieval Muslim writers, he intermixed these stories with narratives relating to Quranic figures, and stories of the prophets, to give them a distinctively Islamic perspective.

The stories of the Pishdadian kings have been politically and culturally influential in Iranian society. Both in antiquity and the Middle Ages, ruling dynasties claimed descent from them in order to be imbued with their prestige and political legitimacy. Into the modern era, the tales of the Shahnameh continue to pervade all aspects of Iranian culture and, as part of that, the Pishdadians remain central to Iranians’ sense of the roots of their own history and national identity.

Origins, etymology and sources

The Pishdadian kings are figures in Persian mythology, about whom a number of legends are recorded in Zoroastrian texts, including the Avesta, and in the Shahnameh, a medieval Persian poem recognised as Iran's national epic.  From the 9th century, the Pishdadians also appear in Arabic prose works of Muslim writers. The overwhelming evidence is that the existence of the Pishdadian dynasty has no historical basis. The various tellings of their story nevertheless portray them as the first Iranian dynasty ruling a mythical kingdom that existed at a time before the Achaemenids, the first historical Persian dynasty. The etymology of Pishdadian (from) is usually thought to mean “those who first promulgated laws”. However, an alternative view is that it comes from paradhata, a word from the Avesta, meaning “created before [others]” or “first created”.

The most canonical account of the mythical early kings of Iran is provided by the Shahnameh, an epic poem of the early 11th century composed by Abolqasem Ferdowsi, a Persian poet from Tus in Khorasan. Considered to be a globally significant literary masterpiece, the poem is a history of Iran from its mythic beginnings to the Muslim conquest at the end of the Sasanian period, and opens with the story of the Pishdadian kings. Ferdowsi's work was the culmination of a long tradition of oral and written prose and poetry, and the stories he drew on may reach back to Indo-European traditions pre-dating Iranian culture. He is thought to have used both oral and written sources, including, apparently, a now lost prose epic compiled in Tus in the mid-10th century, and which itself was based on a late Sasanian chronicle, also now lost, called the Xwadāy-nāmag. Additionally, Ferdowsi may well have used his own poetic imagination to add to or change the stories, although it is difficult to judge the extent to which he did this. Although Ferdowsi was a Muslim writing for a Muslim audience, the Shahnameh is seen as “non-Islamic” (albeit monotheistic) and partly reflecting a Zoroastrian perspective. Ferdowsi excludes Islamic cosmology and chronology from the Shahnameh and makes the pre-Islamic Persian myths the core message of the epic.

Following the Shahnameh, an Iranian tradition of writing epics about mythological heroes lasted for about 300 years. The only significant one to contain material on the Pishdadians was the Garshasp-nama, which opens with a retelling of some of the stories of the Shahnameh.

The mythical kings of the Shahnameh have parallels with characters in the much earlier Avesta, which likely reached its final form by the middle of the first millennium BCE. However, the Avesta gives only brief references to the characters involved, using different or variant names, with little detail of the myths that later find their full expression in the Shahnameh. These are mainly in the yashts or Avestan hymns. Although these references are brief, it is clear from the context and the way they are presented that they allude to stories very similar to the later, more developed, Zoroastrian tradition. Sitting between the Avesta and the Shahnameh are Middle Persian or Pahlavi Zoroastrian texts, such as the Denkard, the Bundahishn and the Ayādgār ī Jāmāspīg. Although they are nearly contemporaneous with the Shahnameh, they may embed stories and traditions from much earlier sources and provide a link with the ancient Avestan texts. They give more detail than the Avestan references on some of the stories relating to the mythic kings, but still do not provide full narratives in the manner of the Shahnameh. In some instances, the descriptions are at variance with both the Shahnameh and the Avesta.

From the 9th century CE, most Muslim “universal histories”, that is histories of the world purportedly from the creation, include an account of the Pishdadian kings. The most important of these, and the one that provides the most comprehensive coverage of traditional pre-Islamic Iranian narratives  what the Iranologist Ehsan Yarshater called Iranian “national history”  is Tabari's History of the Prophets and Kings, written in Arabic during the early 10th century. His narrative intertwines an account of the mythical Persian kings with biblical stories and the prophets of Islam, and integrates the Zoroastrian myths of the Pishdadians’ conflict with evil into the concept of mankind's struggle against satanic forces. Tabari, like Ferdowsi, is thought to have included the lost Xwadāy-nāmag among the sources he used. Tabari's History was an important influence on the Muslim historiography that followed him, and the most significant subsequent Persian development of this genre was the mid-10th century Tarikhnama of Bal'ami. Ostensibly a translation of Tabari's History into Persian, in fact Bal’ami drew on other sources to substantively develop the text; for example, the account of two of the Pishdadian kings, Keyumars (Gayomard) and Jamshid, differs significantly between Bal’ami and Tabari.

The Shahnameh and Zoroastrian narratives

Overview

Zoroastrian belief held that the dynasty originated with the first human, Gayomard (also known as Keyumars and called Gayomart in the Shahnameh and Gaya Maretan in the Avesta), who was brought to life by Ahura Mazda, the creator deity of Zoroastrianism.

In the Shahnameh, Gayomard is the first king of the world and, wearing animal skins and living in the mountains, he teaches humankind how to feed and dress itself and lays down the rules of kingship. During Gayomard's rule, Siyamak, his son, is killed in a battle with the evil deity, Ahriman. Ahriman is, in turn, defeated in a further battle with Gayomard and Siyamak's son, Hushang. Gayomard rules for thirty years and, on his death, is succeeded by Hushang who founds the Pishdadian dynasty.

The epic goes on to tell the story of how the Pishdadians ruled for over two millennia during which they fought demons, gave knowledge and skills to humanity, and created civilisation. However, hubris leads to them being overthrown by an evil tyrant. The throne is eventually restored to the Pishdadians, but they divide their world realm between three different branches of the royal line, creating three new kingdoms: one in the west, one in the east (Turan), and Greater Iran in the centre of the world, later equated with the Sasanian concept of Ērānshahr. This results in an ongoing feud and lengthy war between the Iranians and Turan which ultimately causes the downfall of the Pishdadians and their replacement by a new dynasty, the Kayanians. In all, as narrated in the Shahmaneh, there are ten kings considered to be Pishdadian: Hushang, Tahmuras, Jamshid, Zahhak, Fereydun, Iraj, Manuchehr, Nowzar, Zav and Garshasp. However, Zahhak, Zav and Garshasp are unrelated to the other monarchs.

These stories are not found in the Avesta. Gaya Maretan is referenced as one of the two first living creatures, the other being a bull, without explaining how they were created. In the yashts, or hymns of the Avesta, there are scattered references to characters who subsequently figure in Shahnameh, including the Pishdadians. These are usually in the context of a brief reference to the character sacrificing to the gods in order to ask for their wishes to be granted with short descriptions of their attributes.

The kings
Further details of the Pishdadian kings, as told in the Shahnameh, are summarised below together with their equivalent antecedent characters in the Avesta and the later Pahlavi texts, principally the Denkard and the Bundahishn.

Tabari and the Muslim narratives
Unlike Ferdowsi, the other Muslim authors who include the Persian mythic kings in their histories, sought to adapt the stories to fit Islamic chronology and thinking. Tabari presents several lines of descent of pre-Islamic Persians and claims a number of ways that they may be related or intertwined with  the lines of Islamic prophets or other figures from the Quran. One of these lines is the Pishdadian dynasty. In the following summary of that narrative, the names of the characters used by Tabari have been adopted.

The first Pishdadian kings and the conflict with Iblis
In most Muslim narratives, the first two kings were Jayumart and his grandson Oshahanj, although some count Oshahanj as the first king, likely reflecting the position of late Sasanian sources. Tabari says that “most Persian scholars assume” that Jayumart is Adam, others that he is the son of Adam and Eve, others again “have many diverse statements”, and non-Persians say he is one of a number of other biblical figures (Gomer, Japheth or Noah). He also says that he was a lord in Tabaristan and Fars and that “everyone agrees” that he was the “father” of the Persians. In later life he took the name “Adam” and became a tyrant. His son and daughter, Mari and Mariyanah were the ancestors of kings. According to Tabari, his successor, Oshahanj, was the first king to introduce laws and rule with justice and fairness. Until his rule, humans lived on fruit and clothed themselves with leaves. He built them homes, and taught them to eat meat, use animal skins for clothing, cut trees, mine and work metals and cultivate the land.

A theme of the Muslim writers is the Pishdadian kings' struggle with Iblis and the demons. For Bal'ami, the conflict begins with Jayumart and is positioned as a blood feud. Jayumart flees Mesopotamia, where he was in a dispute with the rest of his family, and settles on Mount Damavand. There he encounters demons living in the region. A conflict ensues and he defeats them, but the demons murder Jayumart's son Pashang and, in revenge, Jayumart kills some of those involved in killing his son. The other demons are forced to build the city of Balkh, "the oldest city of the world's cities".

For Tabari, the conflict begins in Oshahanj's reign and its origins are unclear:

Tabari reports that "the Persians say" that Oshahanj's successor was Tahmurath. He adds that there are differences of opinion on Tahmurath's exact pedigree, although both the pedigrees that he mentions claim that Tahmurath's ultimate ancestor was Oshahanj. Tabari makes brief mention of the continuing struggle with the demons in Tahmurath's reign, and notes that "God gave him so much power that Iblis and his Satans were submissive to him". Other Muslim historians gave Tahmurath the title Divband or Demon-binder, and added a number of mythological events to his story. For example, Biruni relates that Tahmarath was warned of the Flood 231 years before it happened.

From Jam al-Shidh to Zaw: al-Dahhak and war with the Turks 
Tabari says that, according to the "Persian scholars", Tahmurath was succeeded by his brother's son, Jam al-Shidh. Muslim authors typically attribute meanings to al-shidh such as "shine" or "radiance" and, in one instance, that his full name, including Jam, meant "brightness of the moon". Tabari says that his soubriquet was given to him "because of his beauty". Tabari goes on to relate that "Persian scholars" claim that Jam al-Shidh initiated the manufacture of weaponry, iron tools, cloth and other materials, and created the four classes of society: soldiers, religious scholars, secretaries, artisans and cultivators. He then subdued the demons and "forced them to cut stones and rocks from the mountains". However, Iblis persuades him that he is a god. As a consequence, Jam al-Shidh then requires his subjects to worship him, which prompts his overthrow and execution. Tabari is the only author that overtly claims that Jam al-Shidh's downfall was because he was tricked by Iblis.

Al-Dahhak, who Tabari says the Persians call Biswarasb, then seizes power. He was a descendant of Jayumart and a "wicked sorcerer" who ruled for a thousand years after Jam al-Shidh, "displaying tyranny and oppression". Eventually, Kabi initiates an uprising against al-Dahhak. The latter is defeated in battle by Afaridhoun, a descendant of Jam, who becomes king and imprisons Al-dahhak on Mount Damavand. According to Tabari, "some Magians claim that he took al-Dahhak captive and imprisoned him in the mountains, putting a group of jinn in charge of him; others assert that he killed him".

The Muslim historians  including Tabari, Bal’ami, Tha’alebi, and Dinavari  give the same story, in essence, as the Shahnameh of Fereydoun's (Afaridhoun's) division of his realm between his three sons and the subsequent murder of Iraj, his favourite son. In the case of Tabari, Afaridhoun gives the lands of the Turks, Khazars and China to Tuj; Rum, the lands of the Slavs and Georgia are allocated to Sarm; and Ērānshahr, the "centre of the World”, becomes the domain of Iraj.

Tabari says that Sarm and Tuj ruled the earth for 300 years after they had killed their brother. Manushihr, a descendant of Iraj, becomes king and avenges Iraj's murder, by killing Sarm and Tuj. Manushihr's rule was “described as just and generous”. Towards the end of his reign, he is attacked by Frasiyab, king of Turan (that is of the Turks) and a descendant of Tuj. An agreement is made whereby the boundary between their realms is set by having an Iranian archer shoot an arrow from a mountain and where it lands will form the frontier. The arrow landed near Balkh at the Oxus river, which becomes the boundary between the Iranians and the Turks.

Following Manushihr's death, Tabari says that Frasiyab conquered and ruled over Persia until Zaw, a descendant of Manushihr, is chosen as king. Zaw drives out Frasiyab and was “praised for his rule and behaved well towards his subjects”. He was succeeded by Kayqubadh (Kay Qobod) the first of the Kayanian line of kings.

Significance

In order to be imbued with political legitimacy, several ancient and medieval Iranian dynasties claimed descent from the Pishdadians. Prior to the Muslim conquest of Persia, this included the Sasanians, who claimed descent from both the Pishdadians and the Kayanians. Even Muslim dynasties after the conquest claimed Pishdadian descent, for example the Samanids. Late medieval kings and rulers of Iran were highly influenced by the stories of the mythic kings of the Shahnameh. The values and behaviours attributed to the Pishdadians and the other mythic kings and heroes were seen as a “mirror for princes”. Rulers continued to commission lavishly illustrated prestigious manuscripts of the work, such as the Shahnameh of Shah Tahasp or the Great Mongol Shahnameh as even possession of fine copies of the stories enabled a ruler to accrue political legitimacy.

The Shahnameh and its legends have played a key role in the cultural identity of the peoples of Iran, Afghanistan and Tajikistan. The influence of its mythical stories on the culture and beliefs of Iranians has been immense, pervading Iranian education, literature and society. In particular, and despite the evidence of archaeology and modern historical scholarship, the Pishdadian dynasty and its equally mythical successor, the Kayanians, are at the core of Persian people's perspective of Iran's history and informs their sense of national identity. This is reflected in the fact that Iranians persist in calling Persepolis, the site of the Achaemenid capital, by its mythological name, Takht-e Jamshīd (the “Throne of Jamshid”).

Notes

References

Bibliography

Translations of original sources

Bundahishn. 
 Farvardin Yasht.

Secondary works cited

External links
 Smithsonian National Museum of Asian Art - Shahnama: 1000 Years of the Persian Book of Kings
 University of Cambridge Digital Library: Shahnama of Shah Tahmasp (Aga Khan Museum). 10 folios from the Shahnama of Shah Tahmasp

 
Iranian literature
Persian mythology
Shahnameh characters
Legendary Iranian people